David Rhodes may refer to:

 David Rhodes (author) (born 1946), American novelist
 David Rhodes (cricketer) (1847–1937), English-born New Zealand cricketer
 David Rhodes (footballer) (1948–2013), former Australian rules footballer
 David Rhodes (kayaker) (born 1975), Australian sprint canoeist
 David Rhodes (media executive) (born 1973), Executive Chairman, Sky News Group; former president of CBS News
 David Rhodes (guitarist) (born 1956), English guitarist, songwriter, composer and former member of Random Hold
 Rhodes (singer) (born 1988), stagename of David Rhodes, a British musician, singer and songwriter

See also
 David Rhoads (born 1932), American cyclist
 Dave Rhodes, infamous Usenet spammer